"Like a Dog" is a song by Australian alternative rock band Powderfinger. It was released as a single on 15 January 2001, and appeared on the band's fourth studio album, Odyssey Number Five. The song was later included on Fingerprints: The Best of Powderfinger 1994-2000.

The song's lyrics are based on the band's feelings towards Australia's political position of the time. Musically, "Like a Dog" is strongly influenced by Ian Haug (guitar and backing vocals) and his love of Iggy Pop. "Like a Dog"'s video starred Anthony Mundine in a "raging bull" type sequence. Paul Williams - "Rose Against the Odds" also makes an appearance in video.

The Paul Butler and Scott Walton directed music video was nominated for Best Video at the ARIA Music Awards of 2001.

Track listing

 "Like a Dog" – 4:20 (Jon Coghill, John Collins, Bernard Fanning, Ian Haug, Darren Middleton)
 "Love My Way" – 4:36 (Richard Butler, Tim Butler, John Ashton, Vince Ely)
 "Odyssey #2 (The Miseducation of Powderfinger)" – 3:40 (Coghill, Collins, Fanning, Haug, Middleton)

Charts

References

Powderfinger songs
2001 singles
2000 songs
Universal Music Group singles
Songs written by Jon Coghill
Songs written by John Collins (Australian musician)
Songs written by Bernard Fanning
Songs written by Ian Haug
Songs written by Darren Middleton